John Harvey (27 September 1911 – 19 July 1982) was an English actor. He appeared in 52 films, two television films and made 70 television guest appearances between 1948 and 1979.

Born in London, England, he began his acting career on the stage in the 1930s as one of the Harry Hanson's Court Players at the Peterborough Repertory. While there, he met the actress Diana King.

Harvey and King were married, remaining together for more than forty years, until his death.

During the Second World War, he was commissioned in the Royal Air Force. Post-war, he performed at the Theatre Royal in Drury Lane, London, for some six years, during the entire West End runs of Rodgers and Hammerstein's South Pacific and The King and I.

Harvey's film debut was in the role as Eddie in the British crime drama A Gunman Has Escaped (1948), in which he was the leading star. Harvey then moved to character roles and five films later played Inspector Loomis in Hitchcock's Stage Fright (1950) starring Jane Wyman and Richard Todd. His next role was as Bland in the drama Chance of a Lifetime (1950).

Harvey's television debut was as Angelo Verona in the BBC film On the Spot (1948). He played Buster Cox in the United Artists film noir crime/thriller The Man with My Face (1951) starring Barry Nelson.

Among his guest appearances on series television was his role as Sir William Duffy in Dr. Finlay's Casebook (1962) and two Doctor Who appearances – Professor Brett in The War Machines (1966), and Officia in The Macra Terror (1967), all for the BBC.

John Harvey died at age 70 in Henley-on-Thames, Oxfordshire.

Selected filmography

 Moscow Nights (1935) - Minor role (uncredited)
 Noose (1948) - Mack (uncredited)
 A Gunman Has Escaped (1948) - Eddie Steele
 Dick Barton Strikes Back (1949) - Major Henderson
 Private Angelo (1949) - Cpl. McCunn
 Stage Fright (1950) - Inspector Loomis (uncredited)
 Chance of a Lifetime (1950) - Bland
 Cairo Road (1950) - Maj. Maggourys
 Files from Scotland Yard (1951) - Jim Hardy
 Smart Alec (1951)
 The Dark Light (1951) - Roger
 The Man with My Face (1951) - Buster Cox
 Four Days (1951) - Hammond Stubbs
 The Black Widow (1951) - Dr. Wallace
 Lady Godiva Rides Again (1951) - Buller
 High Treason (1951) - Scotland Yard Man
 Angels One Five (1952) - Station Warrant Officer
 Castle in the Air (1952) - Andrews
 The Lost Hours (1952) - Kenneth Peters
 Private's Progress (1956) - RAF Officer at Headquarters (uncredited)
 X the Unknown (1956) - Maj. Cartwright
 True as a Turtle (1957) - First Officer
 The Long Haul (1957) - Supt. Macrea (uncredited)
 Night of the Demon (1957) - Hobart's Brother (uncredited)
 The Man Who Wouldn't Talk (1958) - (uncredited)
 Edge of Fury (1958)
 The 39 Steps (1959) - Detective at Theatre (uncredited)
 Horrors of the Black Museum (1959) - Man in Bookshop
 The Ugly Duckling (1959) - Sergeant Barnes
 The Devil's Disciple (1959) - British officer (uncredited)
 The Stranglers of Bombay (1960) - Burns (uncredited)
 Two-Way Stretch (1960) - Governor Rockhampton Prison
 Hell Is a City (1960) - Fingerprint Officer (uncredited)
 Tunes of Glory (1960) - Sergeant (Bridge Hotel)
Sea Hunt (1960) - Season 3, Episode 21
 Double Bunk (1961) - Johnnie
 The Phantom of the Opera (1962) - Sgt. Vickers
 The Wrong Arm of the Law (1963) - Police Station Sergeant (uncredited)
 Heavens Above! (1963) - Wilson, Prison Officer (uncredited)
 The Kiss of the Vampire (1963) - Police Sergeant
 The Crimson Blade (1963) - Sgt. Grey
 The Old Dark House (1963) - Club Receptionist
 Doomsday at Eleven (1963) - Asst. Commissioner
 Joey Boy (1965) - Signals Officer (uncredited)
 The Psychopath (1966) - Reinhardt Klermer
 The Deadly Bees (1966) - Thompson
 They Came from Beyond Space (1967) - Bill Trethowan
 A Challenge for Robin Hood (1967) - Wallace
 Sacco & Vanzetti (1971) - A. Mitchell Palmer
 The Satanic Rites of Dracula (1973) - Commissionaire
 The Black Windmill (1974) - Heppenstel (uncredited)
 Legend of the Werewolf (1975) - Prefect
 Rollerball (1975) - Directorate Executive (uncredited)
 Rachel and the Beelzebub Bombardiers (1977)
 Le Pétomane (1979)

References

External links

1911 births
1982 deaths
English male stage actors
English male film actors
English male television actors
Male actors from London
Royal Air Force officers
Royal Air Force personnel of World War II
20th-century English male actors